Josiah Manchester Haynes (May 12, 1839—September 3, 1906) was an American businessperson, lawyer, and politician from Augusta, Maine. Haynes was elected to the Maine Legislature five times and served as Senate President in 1879 and Speaker of the House in 1882—83. In business, he was heavily invested in shipbuilding, railroads, timber, and the commercial ice production.

Politics
Haynes, a Republican, served two single year terms in the Maine House of Representatives (1876—77) and two in the Maine Senate (1878—79). As Senate President during a constitutional crisis following the 1878 gubernatorial election, Haynes served as acting governor. In 1882, shortly after legislative terms were changed from one to two years, he was elected again to the House where he was chosen as Speaker.

He was heavily involved in national politics as well. From 1884-92, he served on the Republican National Committee and as delegate to the 1884 Republican National Convention which chose fellow Mainer Sen. James G. Blaine as its presidential nominee.

Business
Haynes was the promoter and president of a number of companies, including the Augusta, Hallowell and Gardiner Electric Railway and Augusta's Opera House. He also served as a director of the Edwards Manufacturing Company, the Knickerbocker Steam and Towage Company, and the Portland Street Railroad Company.

Personal
Haynes was from Waterville, Maine and graduated from Waterville College. At the time of his death in 1906, he was a millionaire. He bequeathed $10,000 in his will to build the "J. Manchester Haynes Home for Nurses," which opened in 1908.

References

1839 births
1906 deaths
Colby College alumni
Politicians from Waterville, Maine
Politicians from Augusta, Maine
Businesspeople from Maine
Republican Party members of the Maine House of Representatives
Republican National Committee members
Speakers of the Maine House of Representatives
Presidents of the Maine Senate
American shipbuilders
19th-century American politicians
19th-century American businesspeople